Manuel Garza González (25 August 1933 – 18 December 2021) was a Mexican politician who served as a member of the Chamber of Deputies. He died on 18 December 2021, at the age of 88.

References

1933 births
2021 deaths
Members of the Chamber of Deputies (Mexico)
Institutional Revolutionary Party politicians
People from Reynosa